The next elections to Falkirk Council was held on 5 May 2022 on the same day as the 31 other Scottish local government elections. The election will use the nine wards created following the Local Government Boundary Commission for Scotland's 5th Review, with 30 councillors being elected. Each ward elected either three or four members, using the STV electoral system.

At the last election in 2017, the Scottish National Party (SNP) won the most seats and formed a minority administration.

Background

Previous election
At the previous election in 2017, the Scottish National Party (SNP) became the largest party, despite losing one seat, overtaking Labour who lost five seats. Two independents were elected, one less than 2012 while the Conservatives gained five seats.

Notes
Votes are the sum of first preference votes across all council wards. The net gain/loss and percentage changes relate to the result of the previous Scottish local elections in May 2012. This is because STV has an element of proportionality which is not present unless multiple seats are being elected. This may differ from other published sources showing gain/loss relative to seats held at dissolution of Scotland's councils.
Following boundary changes, the number of seats in Falkirk fell from 32 in 2012 to 30 in 2017. Gains and losses are represented against national results which may differ from other published sources.

Composition
Since the previous election, several changes in the composition of the council occurred. Labour councillor John McLuckie and Conservative councillor James Kerr were suspended by their respective parties after having been charged by the police following an investigation into planning irregularities in Falkirk. SNP councillor Niall Coleman resigned from the party to become an independent. Two by-elections were held and resulted in an SNP hold and an SNP gain from Labour.

Retiring councillors

Results

Ward summary

|- class="unsortable" align="centre"
!rowspan=2 align="left"|Ward
!% 
!Cllrs
!%
!Cllrs
!%
!Cllrs
!%
!Cllrs
!%
!Cllrs
!%
!Cllrs
!%
!Cllrs
!%
!Cllrs
!rowspan=2|TotalCllrs
|- class="unsortable" align="center"
!colspan=2 bgcolor=""|SNP
!colspan=2 bgcolor=""|Lab
!colspan=2 bgcolor=""|Conservative
!colspan=2 bgcolor=""|Green
!colspan=2 bgcolor=""|Lib Dem
!colspan=2 bgcolor=""|Ind
!colspan=2 bgcolor=""|Alba
!colspan=2 bgcolor="white"|Others
|-
|align="left"|Bo'ness and Blackness
|21.74
|1
|18.64
|1
|15.12
|0
|2.44
|0
|1.61
|0
|bgcolor=""|40.58
|bgcolor=""|1
|colspan="4" 
|3
|-
|align="left"|Grangemouth
|bgcolor="" |44.85
|bgcolor="" |1
|23.38
|1
|15.23
|0
|2.42
|0
|colspan="2" 
|15.06
|1
|colspan="2" 
|0.54
|0
|3
|-
|align="left"|Denny and Banknock
|bgcolor="" |46.49
|bgcolor="" |2
|20.66
|1
|16.16
|0
|3.15
|0
|colspan="2" 
|13.54
|1
|colspan="4" 
|4
|-
|align="left"|Carse, Kinnaird and Tryst
|bgcolor="" |44.37
|bgcolor="" |2
|24.55
|1
|24.06
|1
|4.14
|0
|2.88
|0
|colspan="6" 
|4
|-
|align="left"|Bonnybridge and Larbert
|bgcolor="" |33.88
|bgcolor="" |1
|17.60
|1
|18.41
|0
|4.91
|0
|colspan="2" 
|25.22
|1
|colspan="4" 
|3
|-
|align="left"|Falkirk North
|bgcolor="" |47.41
|bgcolor="" |2
|28.86
|1
|13.27
|1
|5.90
|0
|colspan="4" 
|4.55
|0
|colspan="2" 
|4
|-
|align="left"|Falkirk South
|bgcolor="" |41.66
|bgcolor="" |1
|22.34
|1
|28.56
|1
|5.67
|0
|colspan="2" 
|1.77
|0
|colspan="4" 
|3
|-
|align="left"|Lower Braes
|bgcolor="" |39.35
|bgcolor="" |1
|27.00
|1
|23.34
|1
|5.78
|0
|3.24
|0
|colspan="2" 
|1.30
|0
|colspan="2" 
|3
|-
|align="left"|Upper Braes
|bgcolor="" |34.88
|bgcolor="" |1
|23.13
|1
|21.86
|1
|5.60
|0
|2.53
|0
|10.88
|0
|1.15
|0
|colspan="2" 
|3
|-
|- class="unsortable" class="sortbottom"
!align="left"|Total
!
!
!
!
!
!
!
!
!
!
!
!
!
!
!
!
!30
|}

Ward results

Bo'ness and Blackness
 2012: 2xSNP; 1xLab
 2017: 1xSNP; 1xLab; 1xCon
 2022: 1xSNP; 1xLab; 1xIndependent
 2017-2022 Change: Independent gain one seat from Conservative

Grangemouth
 2012: 2xLab; 1xSNP; 1xIndependent
 2017: 1xSNP; 1xLab; 1xIndependent
 2022: 1xSNP; 1xLab; 1xIndependent
 2017-2022 Change: No change

Denny and Banknock
 2012: 2xSNP; 1xLab 1xIndependent
 2017: 2xSNP; 1xLab; 1xCon
 2022: 2xSNP; 1xLab; 1xIndependent
 2017-2022 Change: Independent gain one seat from Conservative

Carse, Kinnaird and Tryst
 2012: 2xLab; 2xSNP
 2017: 2xSNP; 1xLab; 1xCon
 2022: 2xSNP; 1xLab; 1xCon
 2017-2022 Change: No change

Bonnybridge and Larbert
 2012: 1xSNP; 1xLab; 1xIndependent
 2017: 1xSNP; 1xCon; 1xIndependent
 2022: 1xIndependent; 1xSNP; 1xLab
 2017-2022 Change: Labour gain one seat from Conservative

Falkirk North
 2012: 2xSNP; 2xLab
 2017: 2xSNP; 2xLab
 2022: 2xSNP; 1xLab; 1xCon
 2017-2022 Change: Conservative gain one seat from Labour

Falkirk South
 2012: 2xLab; 1xSNP; 1xCon
 2017: 1xLab; 1xSNP; 1xCon
 2022: 1xSNP; 1xCon; 1xLab
 2017-2022 Change: No change

Lower Braes
 2012: 1xCon; 1xSNP; 1xLab
 2017: 1xCon; 1xSNP; 1xLab
 2022: 1xLab; 1xSNP; 1xCon
 2017-2022 Change: No change

Upper Braes
 2012: 2xLab; 1xSNP
 2017: 1xCon; 1xSNP; 1xLab
 2022: 1xSNP; 1xLab; 1xCon
 2017-2022 Change: No change

Notes

References

Falkirk Council elections
Falkirk